The Puna teal (Spatula puna) is a species of dabbling duck in the family Anatidae. It was at one time regarded as a subspecies of the silver teal.

The Puna teal is resident in the Andes of Peru, western Bolivia, northern Chile, and extreme northwestern Argentina. It is found on the larger lakes and pools in the altiplano.

The status of the Puna teal is Least Concern, as listed on the IUCN Red List.

Taxonomy
The first formal description of the Puna teal was by the Swiss naturalist Johann Jakob von Tschudi in 1844 under the binomial name Anas puna. It was at one time considered as a subspecies of the silver teal in the genus Anas. A molecular phylogentic study comparing mitochondrial DNA sequences published in 2009 found that the genus Anas, as then defined, was non-monophyletic.  The genus was subsequently split into four monophyletic genera with ten species including the Puna teal moved into the resurrected genus Spatula. This genus had been originally proposed by the German zoologist Friedrich Boie in 1822. The name Spatula is the Latin for a "spoon" or "spatula". The specific epithet puna is from the Puna de Atacama, a plateau in the Andes.

Description

They have a black cap that extends to below the eyes. Their lower face and neck are creamy white. Their upper tail coverts are gray, and their rear flanks are dark brown with thin stripes. Back, chest and lower flanks are light coffee with dark brown spots. Their bill is large, light blue with a black line down the middle.

Behaviour

In the wild they live in small groups of their own kind or with the closely related silver teal. Puna teal lay their eggs between April and June. Like swans and geese both parents rear the ducklings. They lay their eggs in long grass, not always close to the water. The eggs are a creamy pink colour of which there may be several. The relationship between the male and female may be long term.

References

Sources
 

Puna teal
Puna teal
Birds of the Puna grassland
Puna teal
Puna teal